Roti is a 1974 Indian Hindi-language action film, produced by Rajni Desai and Rajesh Khanna under the banner Aashirwad Pictures Pvt. Ltd and directed by Manmohan Desai. It stars Rajesh Khanna and Mumtaz, with music composed by Laxmikant Pyarelal. This film was released on 18 October 1974, along with Benaam and Roti Kapda Aur Makaan. Kader Khan was reportedly paid ₹1.21 lakhs for writing dialogues for the film. The film was remade in Telugu as Neram Nadi Kadu Akalidi, starring N.T. Rama Rao and Manjula.

Plot
Mangal Singh has been a career criminal and he is finally sentenced to be hanged due to the murder of a man for the sake of roti. Underworld don, Suraj who raises him as a criminal, plans his escape from jail and is followed by a police inspector. He escapes on a train when he throws a fellow passenger Shravan Kumar off the train. Mangal Singh lands up in a small village in Northern India and becomes a school teacher with the help of a local restaurateur, Bijli. He takes on the identity of Ramu, a friend of Shravan, and goes to live with Shravan's parents, Lalaji and Malti who are blind, little knowing that they are the parents of a man he killed while escaping from the police. 

Bijli falls in love with the reluctant Mangal, but she discovers the truth when inspector Jagdish Raj comes to search Mangal in the same village and informs the blind couple about Shravan's death due to Mangal. Finally, Mangal also learns the truth about Shravan's parents. Mangal reunites Lalaji's long-lost daughter with him, who thereby releases Shravan's house. Mangal takes Shravan's parents for a holy pilgrimage along with Bijli where he meets the alive Shravan again. He pardons him and allows him to escape from the police, but Bijli follows him. While in pursuit of Mangal, Suraj shoots Bijli, but he dies in the snow avalanche. Bijli dies and Mangal is shot by inspector Sujit. The inspector finds Mangal dying with a gun without cartridges asking none to deprive anyone of roti.

Cast
 Rajesh Khanna as Mangal Singh
 Mumtaz as Bijli
 Nirupa Roy as Malti
 Jagdeep as Khadak Singh
 Pinchoo Kapoor as Suraj
 Sujit Kumar as Police Inspector
 Jagdish Raj as Police Inspector
 Viju Khote as Doctor
 Om Prakash as Lalajee
 Vijay Arora as Shravan
 Paintal as Headmaster
 Asrani as Ramu
 Jeetendra as Himself (guest appearance)
 Jeevan as Lalaji
 Pravin Paul as Mrs Lalaji

Soundtrack

Box Office
The film was a major Box-office success of the year and considered to be the mile-stone in the path of illustrious career of Formula-films made by Manmohan Desai. The Film grossed ₹2 crore in India and ₹4 crore worldwide. That works out to ₹160 crore and ₹320 crore resp. at 2018 price.

Remake
The film is loosely inspired by the English movie Face of a Fugitive, a 1959 movie. Vast changes were made in the script of Roti. Later, Roti was remade in Telugu as Neram Nadi Kadu Akalidi, in 1976 starring N.T. Rama Rao.

Awards
 Filmfare Best Editing Award – Kamlakar Karkani

References

External links

1974 films
1970s Hindi-language films
Films directed by Manmohan Desai
Films scored by Laxmikant–Pyarelal
Hindi films remade in other languages
Urdu films remade in other languages
Fictional portrayals of the Maharashtra Police
Avalanches in film